Red vine or redvine may refer to:

 Basella alba, a vegetable also known as red vine spinach
 Brunnichia, a genus of woody vines known as redvine
 Red Vines, a brand of licorice
 "Red Vines", a song from the Aimee Mann album Bachelor No. 2 or, the Last Remains of the Dodo
 Red Vine, a race horse  
 The Red Vine, a painting by George Bellows 
 Siphlophis compressus, also known as red vine snake